Brian Eric Sampson (15 February 1941 – 16 December 2012) was an Australian rules footballer who played for Essendon in the Victorian Football League (VFL) and West Perth in the West Australian Football League (WAFL).

Family

The son of Eric Frank Sampson (1916-2004), and Edna Florence Marie Sampson (1916-1977), née Hamilton.

He had two daughters Nicole and Danielle.

His younger brother Ray Sampson also played in the VFL for Melbourne.

Football

Essendon (VFL)
A top class ruckman, he joined Essendon from East Sandringham Juniors in 1958, and had an injury-interrupted 100-game career with Essendon.

Sampson played in many positions during his time at Essendon and was particularly strong in the air. He debuted in 1959 and finished the year as the resting-back pocket ruckman, in their losing Grand Final side. Although his career was constantly interrupted by knee injuries, he was 19th man for Essendon's 1962 premiership team and, as the resting-forward pocket ruckman, he was one of Essendon's best players in Essendon's 1965 win over St Kilda, where he kicked two goals.

In 1965, he played every game, won the Club's Best Team Player award, and played in his second premiership team.

West Perth (WAFL)
He joined West Australian Football League club West Perth in 1967 and played 49 games, including a premiership in 1969 with the team captain-coached by Polly Farmer. During his time in Western Australia he represented their interstate team.

Bricklayer
Brain's father was a bricklayer and Brian followed in his footsteps running his own bricklaying business and won the Apprenticeship Commission of Victoria's Best Overall Apprentice in bricklaying in 1959.

Brian then trained another 13 other apprentices himself; one of whom, Chris Reid, won Holmesglen College of Tafe Employer Award for "Best Overall Apprentice" in 1991.

Artist

Bonsai
Brian's other passion in life was the art of bonsai and he became acclaimed throughout Australia as a bonsai expert and speaker at clubs. His brought his love of native Australian trees into his art of Bonsai. And against the normal trend of using standard miniature bonsai pots he created bonsai with ceramic pots and ceramic scenes. This was featured on ABC Television and on C31/D44 Melbourne show Eastern Newsbeat.

Publication
During his last years Brian worked to fulfill his dream of publishing a book of his Bonsai Art. Aided by Photographer and Television Producer Patricia Matsoukas Ziemer and, another Bonsai expert, Quentin Valentine, he worked while ill to publish his Bonsai book, featuring his rare native Australian bonsai and ceramic scenes, called  "Miniature trees with imagination Aspects of bonsai and penjing". It was published after his death by his wife Margaret Sampson in 2013.

Ceramics
Brian also had a love affair of ceramics, his aunt was a ceramics teacher and his cousin is artist Greg Irvine. And ceramics are highlighted throughout Brian's bonsai art including figurines he created.

Painting
Brain was also a gifted painter; again featuring Australian Native Forests and water scenes, a few of these signed paintings are photographed in his (2013) book, and in art collections around Melbourne.

Death
He died on 16 December 2012.

Notes

References
 Maplestone, M., Flying Higher: History of the Essendon Football Club 1872–1996, Essendon Football Club, (Melbourne), 1996. 
 Miller, W., Petraitis, V. & Jeremiah, V., The Great John Coleman, Nivar Press, (Cheltenham), 1997. 
 Ross, J. (ed), 100 Years of Australian Football 1897–1996: The Complete Story of the AFL, All the Big Stories, All the Great Pictures, All the Champions, Every AFL Season Reported, Viking, (Ringwood), 1996. 
 
 Organic Gardening, Episode 7: Windsor Street Linear Trail, Native Bonsai, Hanging Baskets, and Merry Garth Garden, Films Media Group, 2007: Brian Sampson is featured in the 6 min. 20sec. segment on "native bonsai".

External links 

Brian Sampson's playing statistics from WAFL Footy Facts

1941 births
West Perth Football Club players
Essendon Football Club players
Essendon Football Club Premiership players
2012 deaths
Australian rules footballers from Victoria (Australia)
Two-time VFL/AFL Premiership players